Luneluah Creek is a stream in the U.S. state of Mississippi. It is a tributary to Beasha Creek.

Luneluah Creek is a name derived from the Choctaw language purported to mean "burnt frog". A variant name is "Suneluah Creek".

References

Rivers of Mississippi
Rivers of Neshoba County, Mississippi
Mississippi placenames of Native American origin